The Taichung Jazz Festival is an annual jazz music festival held in West District, Taichung, Taiwan. The main stage is typically located at Civic Square, a park within Calligraphy Greenway.

History
The festival started in 2003 and is held annually in October. With an initial 30,000 to 40,000 people during its first year, the festival's audience has grown to over 1 million visiters annually. In September 2020, the event organizer had to cancel the festival for the year due to the ongoing COVID-19 pandemic.

See also
 Music of Taiwan
 List of music festivals in Taiwan

References

External links

 

2003 establishments in Taiwan
Annual events in Taiwan
Music festivals in Taiwan
Tourist attractions in Taichung
Autumn events in Taiwan
Jazz festivals